Apoblepta is a monotypic moth genus of moths of the Cybalomiinae subfamily of the Crambidae. It was described by Alfred Jefferis Turner in 1911. It contains only one species, Apoblepta epicharis, which is found in Australia, where it has been recorded from Queensland.

References

Cybalomiinae
Moths of Australia
Crambidae genera
Monotypic moth genera
Taxa named by Alfred Jefferis Turner